The Institute for Structural Research (Instytut Badań Strukturalnych or IBS) is an independent scientific foundation based in Warsaw, established in 2006. The main aim of this organization is to organize and support the research increasing innovation and competitiveness of economy. The foundation inspires and carries out scientific works in the fields of:

 Economics
 Mathematics
 Informatics and quantitative methods
 Social Sciences

Management of the Institute for Structural Research (IBS)
 Piotr Lewandowski – President of the Board
 Iga Magda  – Vice President of the Board
 Julian Zawistowski – Chairman of the Council
 Paweł Kowal – Member of the Council

References

External links

Scientific research foundations
Economic research institutes
Organizations established in 2006